Poky and Friends is a series of animated videos and books produced by Varga TVC Productions and Golden Books Family Entertainment that ran from 1998 until 2003.

Summary
It is a spin-off of classic Little Golden Books characters (The Poky Little Puppy, The Shy Little Kitten, etc.), just like the animated special Little Golden Book Land, although the series featured different character designs for the characters to fit the animated series.

Videos 
Three Poky and Friends VHS tapes, each consisting of five episodes, were released on July 27, 1999 by Sony Wonder. Individual episodes were also shown on Disney Channel's Playhouse Disney block as post-show interstitials from 1999 to 2003.
 Poky and Friends – Poky Little Puppy
 Poky and Friends – Saggy Baggy Elephant
 Poky and Friends – Scuffy the Tugboat

The videos were also released on DVD by Classic Media.

Books 
 Poky and Friends – Tails of Friendship
 Poky and Friends – Lucky Ducks
 Poky and Friends – Out and About (Coloring Book)
 Poky and Friends – The Haunted Tracks
 Poky and Friends – The Truth About Kittens and Puppies
 Poky and Friends – Big River Rescue
 Poky and Friends – Friends and Fun
 Poky and Friends – Come Play with Us
 Poky and Friends – Poky's Bathtime Adventure

References

External links 
 Poky, Saggy Baggy and Scruffy on IMDb
Poky and Friends article from Classic Media
Excerpt on IMDB

DreamWorks Classics franchises
Film series introduced in 1998
Animated film series
Television series by Universal Television
DreamWorks Classics
Little Golden Books
American children's films
Mass media franchises introduced in 1998